is a Japanese footballer who plays as a midfielder for  club Iwaki FC.

Club career 

Haga was born in Tokyo on July 30, 2000. He joined J1 League club FC Tokyo from youth team in 2018.

On 29 January 2022, Haga announced  would join to Iwaki FC from 2023 season. He was also approved as a special designated player on February 18 at same year.

Career statistics

Club 

.

Notes

References

External links
 

2000 births
Living people
Association football people from Tokyo
Japanese footballers
J1 League players
J2 League players
J3 League players
FC Tokyo players
FC Tokyo U-23 players
Iwaki FC players
Association football midfielders